The Robert Award for Best Makeup is an award presented by the Danish Film Academy at the annual Robert Awards ceremony. It has been handed out since 1987, but had no honorees in 1988, 1989, and 1991.

Honorees

1980s 
 1987: Erik Schiødt for 
 1988: Not awarded
 1989: Not awarded

1990s 
 1990: Birthe Lyngsøe and Lene Ravn Henriksen for Waltzing Regitze
 1991: Not awarded
 1992:  - The Boys from St. Petri
 1993: Cecilia Drott for Sofie
 1994: Dennis Knudsen and Anne Cathrine Sauerberg for Black Harvest
 1995: Michael Sørensen for Nightwatch
 1996: Elisabeth Bukkehave for 
 1997: Jennifer Jorfaid and Sanne Gravfort for Breaking the Waves
 1998: Elisabeth Bukkehave for Eye of the Eagle
 1999: Jeanne Müller for

2000s 
 2000: John Janne Kindahl for 
 2001: Charlotte Laustsen for The Bench
 2002: Agneta von Gegerfelt for 
 2003: June Pålgard and Elisabeth Bukkehave for I Am Dina
 2004: Charlotte Laustsen for The Green Butchers
 2005: Louise Hauberg Nielsen and Morten Jacobsen for 
 2006: Kamilla Bjerglind for Nordkraft
 2007: Anne Katrine Sauerberg for A Soap
 2008: Kamilla Bjerglind for Island of Lost Souls
 2009: Sabine Schumann and Jens Bartram for Flame & Citron

2010s 
 2010: Malin Birch-Jensen and Karina Åse for 
 2011: Niamh Morrison for Valhalla Rising
 2012: Lis Kasper Bang for Dirch
 2013: Ivo Strangmüller and Dennis Knudsen for A Royal Affair
 2014: Thomas Foldberg, Morten Jacobsen, and Lone Bidstrup Knudsen for 
 2015: Louise Hauberg Lohmann, Thomas Foldberg and Morten Jacobsen for When Animals Dream

References

External links 
  

1987 establishments in Denmark
Awards established in 1987
Film awards for makeup and hairstyling
Makeup